The Players is a Norwegian musical project consisting of five professional footballers: Freddy dos Santos, Morten Gamst Pedersen, Raymond Kvisvik, Kristofer Hæstad and Øyvind Svenning.

They released the single "This Is For Real" with proceeds from sale of the single going to the Red Cross charity project called Soccer Against Crime.

Norwegian musical groups